The United Kingdom possesses, or has possessed, a variety of weapons of mass destruction, including nuclear, biological, and chemical weapons. The United Kingdom is one of the five official nuclear weapon states under the Treaty on the Non-Proliferation of Nuclear Weapons. The UK renounced the use of chemical and biological weapons in 1956 and subsequently destroyed its general stocks.

Biological weapons

During the Second World War, British scientists studied the use of biological weapons, including a test using anthrax on the Scottish island of Gruinard which left it contaminated and fenced off for nearly fifty years until an intensive four-year program to eradicate the spores was completed in 1990. They also manufactured five million linseed-oil cattle cakes with a hole bored into them for addition of anthrax spores between 1942 and mid-1943. These were to be dropped on Germany using specially designed containers each holding 400 cakes, in a project known as Operation Vegetarian. It was intended that the disease would destroy the German beef and dairy herds and possibly spread to the human population. Preparations were not complete until early 1944. Operation Vegetarian was only to be used in the event of a German anthrax attack on the United Kingdom.

Offensive weapons development continued after the war into the 1950s with tests of plague, brucellosis, tularemia and later equine encephalomyelitis and vaccinia viruses (the latter as a relatively safe simulant for smallpox).

In particular, five sets of trials took place at sea using aerosol clouds and animals.

 Operation Harness off Antigua in 1948–1949.
 Operation Cauldron off Stornoway in 1952. The trawler Carella unknowingly sailed through a cloud of pneumonic plague bacilli (yersinia pestis) during this trial. It was kept under covert observation until the incubation period had elapsed but none of the crew fell ill.
 Operation Hesperus off Stornoway in 1953.
 Operation Ozone off Nassau in 1954.
 Operation Negation off Nassau in 1954-5.

The program was canceled in 1956 when the British government renounced the use of biological and chemical weapons. In 1974, biological weapons were banned, and the United Kingdom ratified the Biological and Toxin Weapons Convention in March 1975.

Chemical weapons

The UK was a signatory of the Hague Conventions (1899 and 1907) which outlawed the use of poison gas in warfare. However, during the First World War, in retaliation to the use of chlorine by Germany against British troops from April 1915 onwards, British forces deployed chlorine themselves for the first time during the Battle of Loos on 25 September 1915. By the end of the war, poison gas use had become widespread on both sides and by 1918 a quarter of artillery shells were filled with gas and Britain had produced around 25,400 tons of toxic chemicals.

Britain used a range of poison gases, originally chlorine and later phosgene, diphosgene and mustard gas. They also used relatively small amounts of the irritant gases chloromethyl chloroformate, chloropicrin, bromacetone and ethyl iodoacetate. Gases were frequently mixed, for example white star was the name given to a mixture of equal volumes of chlorine and phosgene, the chlorine helping to spread the denser but more toxic phosgene. Despite the technical developments, chemical weapons suffered from diminishing effectiveness as the war progressed because of the protective equipment and training which the use engendered on both sides. See Use of poison gas in World War I.

After the war, the Royal Air Force dropped mustard gas on Bolshevik troops in 1919, and Winston Churchill, secretary of state for war and air, suggested that the RAF use it in Iraq in 1920 during a major revolt there. Historians are divided as to whether or not gas was in fact used.

The UK ratified the Geneva Protocol on 9 April 1930. The UK signed the Chemical Weapons Convention on 13 January 1993 and ratified it on 13 May 1996.

Despite the signing of the Geneva Protocol, the UK carried out extensive testing of chemical weapons from the early 1930s onwards. In the Rawalpindi experiments, hundreds of Indian soldiers were exposed to mustard gas in an attempt to determine the appropriate dosage to use on battlefields. Many of the subjects suffered severe burns from their exposure to the gas.

Many ex-servicemen have complained about suffering long term illnesses after taking part in tests on nerve agents. It was alleged that before volunteering they were not provided with adequate information about the experiments and the risk, in breach of the Nuremberg Code of 1947. Alleged abuses at Porton Down became the subject of a lengthy police investigation called Operation Antler, which covered the use of volunteers in testing a variety of chemical weapons and countermeasures from 1939 until 1989. An inquest was opened on 5 May 2004 into the death on 6 May 1953 of a serviceman, Ronald Maddison, during an experiment using sarin. His death had earlier been found by a private MoD inquest to have been as a result of "misadventure" but this was quashed by the High Court in 2002. The 2004 hearing closed on 15 November, after a jury found that the cause of Maddison's death was "application of a nerve agent in a non-therapeutic experiment".

Nuclear weapons

British nuclear weapons are designed and developed by the UK's Atomic Weapons Establishment. The United Kingdom has four  submarines armed with nuclear armed Trident missiles. The principle of operation is based on maintaining deterrent effect by always having at least one submarine at sea, and was designed during the Cold War period. One submarine is normally undergoing maintenance and the remaining two are in port or on training exercises.

Each submarine carries up to sixteen Trident II D-5 missiles, which can each carry up to twelve warheads, for a maximum of 192 warheads per vessel. However, the British government announced in 1998 that each submarine would carry only 48 warheads (halving the limit specified by the previous government), which is an average of three per missile. However one or two missiles per submarine are probably armed with fewer warheads for "sub-strategic" use causing others to be armed with more.

The British-designed warheads are thought to be selectable between 0.3 kilotons, 5–10 kt and 100 kt; the yields obtained using either the unboosted primary, the boosted primary, or the entire "physics package". The United Kingdom has purchased the rights to 58 missiles under the Polaris Sales Agreement (modified for Trident) from the United States Navy's "pool". These missiles are fitted with United Kingdom–built warheads and are exchanged when requiring maintenance. Under the agreement the United States was given certain assurances by the UK regarding the use of the missiles; however the United States does not have any veto on the use of British nuclear weapons. Some non-nuclear components for the British nuclear warhead are procured from the U.S. for reasons of cost effectiveness.

The United Kingdom is one of the five "Nuclear Weapons States" (NWS) under the Nuclear Non-Proliferation Treaty, which the UK ratified in 1968.

The UK permits the U.S. to deploy nuclear weapons from its territory, the first having arrived in 1954. During the 1980s nuclear armed USAF Ground Launched Cruise Missiles were deployed at RAF Greenham Common and RAF Molesworth. As of 2005 it is believed that about 110 tactical B61 nuclear bombs are stored at RAF Lakenheath for deployment by USAF F-15E aircraft.

In March 2007, the UK Parliament voted to renew the country's Trident nuclear submarine system at a cost of £20bn. In July 2008, The Guardian claimed that the decision had already been made to replace and upgrade Britain's nuclear warhead stockpile at a cost of £3bn, extending the life of the warheads until 2055.

On 25 February 2020, the UK released a Written Statement outlining that the current UK nuclear warheads will be replaced and will match the US Trident SLBM and related systems.

In March 2021, the British government published the Integrated Review, titled Global Britain in a Competitive Age, which reaffirmed the government's commitment to upgrading and maintaining Trident as a continuous at-sea deterrent. The review also announced that the cap for the UK's stockpile of nuclear warheads would rise from 180 to 260 — the first time it has risen since the Cold War — due to the "evolving security environment".

See also
 British Armed Forces

References

Further reading
 Boudeau, Carole. "Missing the logic of the text: Lord Butler’s report on intelligence on Iraqi weapons of mass destruction." Journal of Language and Politics 11.4 (2012): 543-561.
 Fidler, David P. "International law and weapons of mass destruction: end of the arms control approach." Duke Journal of Comparative and International Law 14 (2004): 39+ online.
 Jones, Matthew. The Official History of the UK Strategic Nuclear Deterrent: Volume I: From the V-Bomber Era to the Arrival of Polaris, 1945-1964 (Taylor & Francis, 2017).
 Jones, Matthew. The Official History of the UK Strategic Nuclear Deterrent: Volume II: The Labour Government and the Polaris Programme, 1964-1970 (Taylor & Francis, 2017).
 Salisbury, Daniel. Secrecy, Public Relations and the British Nuclear Debate: How the UK Government Learned to Talk about the Bomb, 1970-83 (Routledge, 2020).

External links
 Video archive of the UK's Nuclear Testing at sonicbomb.com
 FAS bulletin
 The Nuclear Threat Initiative on the United Kingdom
 Churchill's Anthrax Bombs - A Debate by Julian Lewis and Professor RV Jones
 The Plan that Never Was: Churchill and the 'Anthrax Bomb' by Julian Lewis
 Nuclear Files.org Current information on nuclear stockpiles in the United Kingdom

United Kingdom and weapons of mass destruction, The
Weapons of mass destruction by country